Edward Graczyk (born 1941/1942)is a playwright originally from Ohio.  He wrote several children's plays early in his career, but became better known as the author of 1976's Come Back to the Five and Dime, Jimmy Dean, Jimmy Dean.  In 1982, Graczyk won the Best Screenplay Award at the Belgium International Film Festival for Robert Altman's motion picture adaptation.

Career
Graczyk was born in Pennsylvania. Between 1968 and 1973, he lived in Midland, Texas and wrote children's plays such as Aesop's Falables and Livin' de Life.  He began to develop his stage drama Come Back to the Five and Dime, Jimmy Dean, Jimmy Dean, after driving to the small town of Marfa and researching the customs of the area.  The legend of actor James Dean, and the closure of five-and-dime stores in this place, lent their influences to the play's development.  Graczyk went on to say:

After his brief stay in Texas, he moved back to Ohio and served as the artistic director of the Players Theatre in Columbus, Ohio; his tenure there lasted from 1973 to 1993.  The first version of Jimmy Dean premiered in September 1976 at Players Theatre; in early 1980, it moved to New York City for a brief run before filmmaker Robert Altman acquired the rights.  The resulting Broadway version, which premiered in February 1982, was not a critical success.  Nonetheless, Altman soon managed to make a low-budget film adaptation financed by Viacom Enterprises and Mark Goodson Productions.  The film won numerous awards at film festivals, including Best Film at Chicago;  Ed Graczyk won for Best Screenplay at the Belgium International event.

The playwright followed up Jimmy Dean with A Murder of Crows, which opened at New York's South Side Theater in September 1988.  In the early 1990s, he wrote a one-man show with Keith Carradine entitled My Time Ain't Long.  By 2003, he was living in Ohio's Miami Valley area and was still writing plays, although in his words, "There are currently several scripts running around in my computer looking for an exit."  His most recent work, The Blue Moon Dancing, premiered in Dallas on August 20, 2010.

Throughout his career, Graczyk has also served as a theater designer and administrator.  He has worked with various institutions such as the Hartford Stage Company and the Erie Playhouse.

Selected works

See also
List of playwrights from the United States

Notes

References

External links
 
 

1941 births
Living people
20th-century American dramatists and playwrights
American male screenwriters
American male dramatists and playwrights
20th-century American male writers
Screenwriters from Ohio